30 Inolvidables (Eng.: 30 Unforgettables) is a compilation album released by the Mexican group Los Bukis. This album was their first number-one album in the Billboard Top Latin Albums chart.

Track listing

Chart performance

Sales and certifications

References

Los Bukis compilation albums
2002 greatest hits albums
Fonovisa Records compilation albums